

Club records

Largest victories
Listed are the largest victories of AFC Ajax, with at least eight goals scored.

Largest defeats
Listed are the largest defeats of Ajax, with at least five goals conceded.

Biggest European comebacks
Listed are the biggest comebacks of Ajax, where Ajax lost the first leg of the match, but then advanced after winning the return leg.

Biggest European eliminations
Listed are the biggest eliminations of Ajax, where Ajax suffered the largest defeats on aggregate scores in European tournaments.

Individual records

All-time top scorers
This list consists of Ajax players that have scored 50 or more goals in official competitions for the first team. There are a total of 17 players that have scored 100 goals or more. Luis Suárez was the last player to reach this landmark. Piet van Reenen is first on the list with 278 goals. Between 1929 and 1938, he was the club top scorer for nine straight seasons, scoring an average of one goal per match.

Ajax top scorers by season

The following is a list of players who have finished as the club top scorers for Ajax by season.

 In the 1958–59 season, Wim Bleijenberg and Piet van der Kuil tied as the club's leading scorers in league matches with 15 goals, whilePiet van der Kuil led the club with 30 goals scored overall.
 In the 1969–70 season, Johan Cruyff and Dick van Dijk tied as the club's leading scorers in league matches with 23 goals, while Johan Cruyff led the club with 33 goals scored overall.
 In the 1988–89 season, Dennis Bergkamp and Stefan Pettersson tied as the club's leading scorers in league matches with 13 goals, and overall with 16 goals scored.
 In the 1996–97 season, Patrick Kluivert and Jari Litmanen tied as the club's leading scorers in league matches with 6 goals, and overall with 8 goals scored.
 In the 1998–99 season, Jari Litmanen and Benni McCarthy tied as the club's leading scorers in league matches with 11 goals, while Jari Litmanen led the club with 13 scored overall.
 In the 2004–05 season, Ryan Babel and Wesley Sneijder tied as the club's leading scorers in league matches with 7 goals, while Ryan Babel led the club with 9 goals scored overall.
 In the 2013–14 season, Davy Klaassen and Kolbeinn Sigþórsson tied as the club's leading scorers in league matches with 10 goals, while Lasse Schöne led the club with 13 goals scored overall.
 In the 2019–20 season, Quincy Promes and Dušan Tadić tied as the club's leading scorers overall with 16 goals, while Quincy Promes led the club in league goals scored with 12.

Jong Ajax top scorers by season

The following is a list of players who have finished as top scorers of the reserves' team Jong Ajax by season.

40 goals in one season

The following is a list of players who have scored 40 or more goals for Ajax in a single season.

Youngest team fielded in Eredivisie history
On 14 May 2017, manager Peter Bosz fielded the youngest team in Eredivisie history, with an average age of 20 years and 139 days, when they played Willem II on the final match day of the 2016–17 Eredivisie season. At the age of 24, Davy Klaassen was the oldest on the pitch and was joined by two players aged 21, five aged 20, a 19-year-old, 18-year-old and a 17-year-old.

The Youngest team Lineup:

 André Onana (GK)
 Kenny Tete (RB)
 Davinson Sánchez (CB)
 Matthijs de Ligt (CB)
 Jaïro Riedewald (LB)
 Davy Klaassen (CM)
 Donny van de Beek (CM)
 Frenkie de Jong (CM)
 David Neres (RW)
 Kasper Dolberg (ST)
 Justin Kluivert (LW)
 Peter Bosz (Manager)

Youngest players to make league debut
The following is a list of the youngest Ajax players to debut for the club in Eredivisie history.

Players to score on their league debut

The following is a list of the youngest Ajax players to score on their debut in Eredivisie history.

Youngest players to score a league goal

The following is a list of the youngest Ajax players to score a goal in Eredivisie history. The list also includes how many matches were played prior to scoring.

Top 5 youngest to score a league own goal
The following is a list of the top five youngest Ajax players to score an own goal in Eredivisie history.

Top 10 most assists in the Eredivisie of all time
The following is a list of the top ten Ajax players for most assists in Eredivisie history.

 The amount of assists are a total of all assists given in league history from all league appearances and not solely while playing for Ajax

Highest scoring in the National Cup

The following is a list of the players who have scored the most goals for Ajax in the KNVB Cup, with at least five goals scored.

Most goals in a single cup match
The following is a list of the players who have scored the most goals for Ajax in a single KNVB Cup match, with at least three goals scored.

KNVB Cup top scorers
The following is a list of players who finished as top scorers of the KNVB Cup.

Highest scoring in the Champions League

The following is a list of the players who have scored the most goals for Ajax in the Champions League (not including qualifying rounds), with at least four goals scored.

Highest scoring in Europe (all competitions)

The following is a list of the top 10 players who have scored the most goals for Ajax in the Champions League, Europa League, UEFA Super Cup.

Players with most appearances
The following is a list of the top 10 players who have played the most matches for Ajax.

Most successful managers
The following is a list of the Ajax managers who have won the most Eredivisie titles at the helm of Ajax.

In May 1985, the Driemanschap (English: Three man team) Tonny Bruins Slot, Spitz Kohn and Cor van der Hart succeeded Aad de Mos as Interim managers.

Managers with consecutive titles
The following is a list of the Ajax managers who have won the most consecutive Eredivisie titles at the helm of Ajax.

 The 2019–20 Eredivisie season was cancelled due to the COVID-19 pandemic in the Netherlands. Although Ajax were in first place, no title was awarded, resulting in Erik ten Hag having won three consecutive titles with a gap of one season.

Top 25 most expensive transfers

The following is a list of the top 25 most expensive transfers in the club's history for both the club acquisitions and departures.

Top 25 most expensive player acquisitions

Top 25 most expensive players sold

AFC Ajax prize winners
At the end of each season, Ajax has awarded their top player of the season, the top talent of the season, and the top prospect from their training ground De Toekomst (The Future) with the following awards. Since 1993, the AFC Ajax Player of the Year (Dutch: Ajacied van het Jaar) is awarded the Rinus Michels Award, the AFC Ajax Talent of the Year (Dutch: Talent van het Jaar) is awarded the Marco van Basten Award since 1994. The club's top prospect from the training ground, the Talent of the Future (Dutch: Talent van De Toekomst) has been awarded the Sjaak Swart Award since 1999.

In 2018 the Talent of the Future award was renamed the Abdelhak Nouri Award, in honour of Abdelhak Nouri in commemoration of the 'jewel of the training ground', almost a year after the player had suffered an arrhythmia attack in a pre-season friendly match against Werder Bremen.

VVCS-gala prize winners
The VVCS-gala is an annual gala which takes place at the end of each season, where the best Dutch Footballer, best keeper, topscorer of the Eredivisie, and the talent of the year are awarded. 
Here are a list Ajax players who have received awards at the gala in the past.

Dutch Footballer of the Year

Dutch Footballer of the Year is an award honouring the best Dutch Football player in the Eredivisie. Now the Golden boot is award to the best Footballer, when the two awards used to be presented separately in the past. The prize is nominated by De Telegraaf and Voetbal International, and is presented at the VVCS-gala.

Dutch Goalkeeper of the Year

The Dutch Goalkeeper of the Year was a title awarded to the best Goalkeeper of the Dutch Eredivisie. The prize was awarded at the gala from 1987 to 2004. Until 1997, the prize was awarded annually, but was awarded by the season after 1998–99.

Dutch Talent of the Year

The Dutch Talent of the Year was a title awarded to the best Talent of the Dutch Eredivisie from 1984 to 2004. It was merged with the Johan Cruijff Prijs the following season.

Dutch Manager of the year

The Dutch professional manager of the Year is a title awarded to the best professional manager of the Dutch Eredivisie from 2003 to present. It is known as the Rinus Michels Award. (not to be confused with the AFC Ajax award by the same name)

Eredivisie top scorers

The following is a list of Ajax players who have finished the season as top scorer of the Dutch Eredivisie.

International prize winners

Ballon d'Or
1st place
The following players received the Ballon d'Or award whilst playing for AFC Ajax:
 Johan Cruyff – 1971*
One other former Ballon d'Or winner and former Ajax player was hired by AFC Ajax: Marco van Basten winning the Ballon d'Or in 1988, 1989, 1992 coached the team for the 2008–09 season.
Johan Cruyff went on to win the Ballon d'Or twice more in 1973 and 1974 whilst prying his trade for FC Barcelona.
3rd place finish
The following players finished in third place in the Ballon d'Or award whilst playing for AFC Ajax:
 Ruud Krol – 1979
 Dennis Bergkamp – 1992
 Jari Litmanen – 1995

European Golden Shoe
The following players have won the European Golden Shoe whilst playing for AFC Ajax:
 Wim Kieft (32 goals) – 1982
 Marco van Basten (37 goals) – 1986

European Cup/Champions League top scorer
The following players have finished as top scorer of the European Cup/Champions League whilst playing for AFC Ajax:
 Johan Cruyff (5 goals) – 1971–72
 Søren Lerby (10 goals) – 1979–80
 Jari Litmanen (9 goals) – 1995–96

UEFA Cup/Europa League top scorer
The following players have finished as top scorer of the UEFA Cup/Europa League whilst playing for AFC Ajax:
 Ruud Geels (14 goals) – 1975–76

European Golden Boy
The following players have won the Golden Boy Award whilst playing for AFC Ajax:
 Rafael van der Vaart – 2003
 Matthijs de Ligt – 2018

UEFA Jubilee Golden Player
The following players were commemorated as the Golden Players for each member association at UEFA's 50th anniversary in 2004:
 Johan Cruyff
 Michael Laudrup
 Jari Litmanen

UEFA Euro Golden Boot
The following players were awarded the golden boot at the UEFA European Championship whilst playing for AFC Ajax:
 Dennis Bergkamp (1992)

UEFA Euro Team of the Tournament
The following players made the Best XI at the UEFA European Championship whilst playing for AFC Ajax:
 Ruud Krol (1976)
 Dennis Bergkamp (1992)

FIFA World Cup All-Star Team
The following players made the FIFA World Cup All-Star team at the FIFA World Cup whilst playing for AFC Ajax:
 Frank de Boer (1998)
 Michael Laudrup (1998)
 Edwin van der Sar (1998)
 Luis Suárez (2010)

FIFA World Cup Best Young Player Award
The following players were awarded the Best Young Player Award at the FIFA World Cup whilst playing for AFC Ajax:
 Marc Overmars (1994)

Ajax players on the Dutch national team

The following is a list of players who have played for the Netherlands national football team while playing for Ajax. The first column reflects the player's caps for the national team during their tenure at Ajax, while the second column shows the player's total appearances for the national team. The third column represents the number of goals scored in total, except when marked with an asterisk (*), which indicates goals conceded in case of a goalkeeper.

Statistics accurate as of 18 November 2020 after the match against Poland.

Ajax players in international tournaments
The following is a list of Ajax players who have competed in international tournaments, including the FIFA World Cup, FIFA Confederations Cup, UEFA European Championship, UEFA Nations League Finals, CONCACAF Nations League Finals, CONCACAF Gold Cup, the Copa América and the Africa Cup of Nations. To this date no Ajax players have participated in the AFC Asian Cup, or the OFC Nations Cup while playing for Ajax.

 Medals in the table above indicate the final placement achieved at the tournament.

Ajax youth players in international youth tournaments
The following is a list of Ajax players who have competed in international youth tournaments, including the international youth tournaments of UEFA, but also the AFC (Asia), CAF (Africa), and CONCACAF (North-America). To this date no Ajax players have participated in the CONMEBOL (South America) or the OFC (Oceania) youth competitions.

 Medals in the table above indicate the final placement achieved at the tournament.

Ajax players at the Olympic games
The following is a list of Ajax players who have competed in the Summer Olympics while playing for Ajax.

Medals in the table above indicate the final placement in the medal table achieved at the specific Olympic games.

References

Records